The 2020 Utah House of Representatives election was held in the U.S. state of Utah on November 3, 2020 to elect members to the House of Representatives. Elections were held in 75 electoral districts to elect two-year term members to the 64th Utah State Legislature. Elections were also held throughout the state for U.S. president, the U.S. House, and for the Utah Senate.

Primary elections were held on June 30, 2020.

The Republican Party retained majority control of the House by a large margin, losing only one seat to the Democratic Party in the process. This election was the first time the Democrats won 17 seats since 2010.

Predictions

Results

Overview

Close races 
Districts where the margin of victory was under 10%:

District 1

District 2

District 3

District 4

District 5

District 6

District 7

District 8

District 9

District 10

District 11

District 12

District 13

District 14

District 15

District 16

District 17

District 18

District 19

District 20

District 21

District 22

District 23

District 24

District 25

District 26

District 27

District 28

District 29

District 30

District 31

District 32

District 33

District 34

District 35

District 36

District 37

District 38

District 39

District 40

District 41

District 42

District 43

District 44

District 45

District 46

District 47

District 48

District 49

District 50

District 51

District 52

District 53

District 54

District 55

District 56

District 57

District 58

District 59

District 60

District 61

District 62

District 63

District 64

District 65

District 66

District 67

District 68

District 69

District 70

District 71

District 72

District 73

District 74

District 75

Notes

References 

House
Utah House
Utah House of Representatives elections